The Dodge Viper is a sports car that was manufactured by Dodge (by SRT for 2013 and 2014), a division of American car manufacturer FCA US LLC from 1992 until 2017, having taken a brief hiatus in 2007, and from 2010 to 2012. Production of the two-seat super car began at New Mack Assembly Plant in 1991 and moved to Conner Avenue Assembly Plant in October 1995.

Although Chrysler considered ending production because of serious financial problems, on September 14, 2010, then-chief executive Sergio Marchionne announced and previewed a new model of the Viper for 2012. In 2014, the Viper was named number 10 on the "Most American Cars" list, meaning 75% or more of its parts are manufactured in the U.S. The Viper was eventually discontinued in 2017 after 26 years of production.

The 0-60 mph time on a Viper varies from around 3.5-seconds to 4.5 seconds. Top speed ranges from 160 mph to over 200 mph, depending on variant and year.

Development history
The Viper was initially conceived in late 1988 at Chrysler's Advanced Design Studios. The following February, Chrysler president Bob Lutz suggested to Tom Gale at Chrysler Design Center that the company should consider producing a modern Cobra, and a clay model was presented to Lutz a few months later. Produced in sheet metal by Metalcrafters, the car appeared as a concept at the North American International Auto Show in 1989. Public reaction was so enthusiastic that chief engineer Roy Sjoberg was directed to develop it as a standard production vehicle. But then Chrysler chairman Lee Iacocca delayed approving the $70 million needed to put the sports car into production, saying it was a lot to spend without assurance of financial return.

Sjoberg selected 85 engineers to be "Team Viper", with development beginning in March 1989. The team asked the then-Chrysler subsidiary Lamborghini to cast a prototype aluminum block for the sports car to use in May. The production body was completed in Fall 1989, with a chassis prototype running in December. Though a V8 engine was first used in the test mule called White Mule, the V10 engine, which the production car was meant to use, was ready in February 1990. Official approval from Iacocca came in May 1990. By auto industry standards $70 million was not a lot of money but the potential in improved image was fantastic. One year later, Carroll Shelby piloted a pre-production car as the pace vehicle in the Indianapolis 500 race. In November 1991, the car was released to reviewers with the first retail shipments beginning in January 1992.

The powerful two-seater, which sold for $52,000, sparked immediate interest in the Dodge brand among enthusiasts and the automotive press. Lutz hoped it would raise the spirits of the designers and engineers who were discouraged by the homely, unpopular cars that they had been commanded to produce. The popularity of the Viper overshadowed the recent failure of Iacocca's pet car, the TC, which had cost five times as much to develop.

Models

First generation (SR I; 1991–1995) 

The first prototype was tested in January 1989. It debuted in 1991 with two pre-production models as the pace car for the Indianapolis 500 when Dodge was forced to substitute it in place of the Japanese-built Dodge Stealth, because of complaints from the United Auto Workers, and went on sale in January 1992 as the RT/10 Roadster.

Lamborghini (then owned by Chrysler Corporation) helped with the design of the V10 engine for the Viper, which was based on the Chrysler's LA V8 engine. A major contributor to the Viper since the beginning was Dick Winkles, the chief power engineer, who had spent time in Italy overseeing the development of the engine.

Originally engineered to be a performance car, the Viper had no exterior-mounted door handles or key cylinders and no air conditioning (however, this was added as an option for the 1994-95 models, and climate controls featured a "snowflake" icon, which indicated a potential setting for the A/C). The roof was made from canvas, and the windows were made from vinyl using zippers to open and close, much like the Jeep Wrangler. However, the Viper was still equipped with some domestic features, including manually-adjustable leather-trimmed sport bucket seats with lumbar support, an AM/FM stereo cassette player with clock and high fidelity sound system, and interior carpeting. Aluminium alloy wheels were larger in diameter due to the larger brakes. A lightweight fiberglass hard roof option on later models was also available to cover the canvas soft roof, and was shipped with each new car. There were also no airbags, in the interest of weight reduction. Adjustable performance suspension was also an available option for most Vipers.

The body is a tubular steel frame with resin transfer molding (RTM) fiberglass panels. Its large tires allow the car to average close to one lateral g in corners. However, the car proves tricky to drive at high speeds, particularly for the unskilled driver.

Second generation (SR II, 1996–2002) 

The second-generation Viper, codenamed "SR II" was introduced in 1996. A removable hardtop was now available along with a sliding glass window. Some steel suspension components were replaced by aluminum, resulting in a  weight reduction.

Later in the 1996 model year, Dodge introduced the Viper GTS, a new coupé version of the Viper RT/10. Dubbed the “double bubble”, the roof featured slightly raised sections that looked like bubbles to accommodate the usage of helmets and taking design cues from the Shelby Daytona designed by Pete Brock. More than 90% of the GTS was new in comparison to the RT/10 despite similar looks. The 1996 GTS would be the first Viper to be equipped with airbags and also included air conditioning, power windows and power door locks as standard equipment. The Viper GTS would be chosen as the pace car for the 1996 Indianapolis 500.

Minor updates would continue in 1997 and 1998. In 1997, the RT/10 would receive a power increase to 450 hp along with airbags and power windows. In 1998, both of the versions of the Viper were equipped with second-generation airbags, revised exhaust manifolds (saving  over the previous cast iron components) along with a revised camshaft.

In 2000, the engine was updated to lighter hypereutectic pistons and the car received factory frame improvements. While the hypereutectic pistons provided less expansion, the forged pistons were preferred by customers for the supercharged and turbocharged aftermarket packages. TSB (Technical Service Bulletin) recalls (998 and 999) were done at local dealerships to repair the 1996 to 1999 Viper frames by adding gussets with rivets near the steering box. The 2001 models saw the addition of anti-lock braking system.

Colors would vary throughout the second generation. Dodge would offer three or four colors per model year. Some colors such as steel gray were only offered for one model year (MY2000) while other colors such as red were offered during the entire second generation.  Interior colors and wheel options would also vary throughout the second generation. The cobalt blue color of the Dodge Viper GTS seen in the Viper (TV series) was exclusively available to the series.

Stripes would be an option beginning in 1996. The GTS stripes were larger, fuller stripes than the stripes offered on the 1996 RT/10. The GTS had twin stripes (8 inches wide with a 4-inch gap in between) that ran from the front bumper all the way through the rear bumper. 1996 was the only model year in which the stripes would run through the rear license plate area. Stripes on later models would run from front to rear but did not run through the rear license plate area.

The RT/10 was replaced by the SRT-10 roadster in 2003, and the GTS was replaced in 2006 by the SRT-10 coupé.

Third generation (ZB I, 2003–2006) 

The Dodge Viper underwent a major redesign in 2002, courtesy of DaimlerChrysler's Street and Racing Technology group, taking cues from the Dodge Viper GTS-R concept presented in 2000. The new Viper SRT-10, which replaced both the GTS and the RT/10, was heavily restyled with sharp, angled bodywork. The chassis was also improved, becoming more rigid and weighing approximately  less than the previous model.

An even lighter and stronger aluminum space frame chassis was in development for the next generation model, but the project was shelved because of parent company Chrysler's financial crisis. The still born project, created by Mercedes in the first place, was used as a basis by Daimler for the development of the Mercedes-Benz SLS AMG.

The initial model introduced was a convertible. In 2004, Dodge introduced a limited-edition Mamba package; Mamba-edition cars featured black interiors, with red stitching and trim, price increased by about $3,000. 200 cars with the Mamba package were produced.

The Viper SRT-10 Coupé was introduced at the 2005 Detroit Auto Show as a 2006 model. It shares many of its body panels with the convertible, but borrows its side and rear styling from the Competition Coupé concept. The coupé looks much like the previous Viper GTS and retains the "double-bubble" roof shape of the original along with the original GTS' tail lights, as well as retaining the original GTS Blue with white stripes paint scheme on the initial run of First Edition cars like the original Viper coupé. Unlike the original coupé, the chassis was not modified.

No cars were produced for the 2007 model year; instead, Chrysler extended production of the 2006 model while preparing the updated 2008 model.

Fourth generation (ZB II, 2008–2010) 

The engine also received better flowing heads with larger valves, MECADYNE cam-in-cam variable valve timing on the exhaust cam lobes, and dual electronic throttle bodies. The rev limit could be increased by 300 rpm due to the improved valvetrain stability from both the new camshaft profiles and valve springs. The engine was developed with some external assistance from McLaren Automotive and Ricardo Consulting Engineers. Electronic engine control was developed by Continental AG; the controller can monitor the crankshaft and cylinder position up to six times during each firing and has 10 times more processing power than the previous unit.

Changes outside of the engine were less extreme, but a distinction between the third and fourth generation of the Viper is the vented engine cover. The Tremec T56 transmission was replaced with a new Tremec TR6060 with triple first-gear synchronizers and doubles for higher gears. The Dana M44-4 rear axle from the 2003–2006 model now had a GKN ViscoLok speed-sensing limited-slip differential that greatly helps the tires in getting grip under acceleration. Another performance upgrade was the removal of run-flat tires; the new Michelin Pilot Sport 2 tires increased grip and driver feedback and, along with revised suspension (springs, anti-roll bars, and shock valving), made the Viper more neutral in cornering.

Another notable change was the reworked exhaust system; previous third-generation cars had their exhaust crossover under the seats which resulted in a large amount of heat going into the cockpit, which was done initially to help improve the car's exhaust note, since the first two generations of the Viper, which had no crossover, were criticized for their lackluster exhaust notes. The car now featured a new exhaust system with no crossover, reducing the heat that entered the cockpit.

The electrical system was completely revised for 2008. Changes included a 180-amp alternator, twin electric cooling fans, electronic throttles, and completely new VENOM engine management system. CAN bus architecture had been combined with pre-existing systems to allow for regulatory compliance. The fuel system was upgraded to include a higher-capacity fuel pump and filtration system.

The Viper ACR made a return for the ZB II generation and was put through its paces at the Nürburgring clocking in a record time of 7:22.1. Kuno Wittmer piloted a street legal 2010 Dodge Viper ACR to a record lap of 1:59.995 at Miller Motorsports Park in Tooele, Utah, on Monday, April 11, breaking the 2-minute mark for the first time in a production car on the 3.048-mile Outer Course configuration.

On November 4, 2009, Dodge Brand President and CEO Ralph Gilles announced that the Viper would end production in the summer of 2010.

During an event hosted by Dodge and the Viper Club of America on July 1, 2010, the final production ZB II Viper, which was given a gold finish and accentuated by contrasting orange stripes, rolled off the assembly line and was presented before attendees of the ceremony.

Fifth generation (VX, 2013–2017) 

At a dealer conference on September 14, 2010 in Orlando, Florida, the then Chrysler Group and Fiat CEO Sergio Marchionne was reported to have concluded his remarks by unveiling a rolling 2012 Dodge Viper prototype.

Ralph Gilles was in attendance and gathered feedback from potential customers about the exterior design of the car. The Generation-5 badge was unveiled as well at this event on each dining table in the hall.

In Autumn of 2011, Ralph Gilles announced that the next generation of the Viper would debut at the New York Auto Show in April 2012.

The 2013 SRT Viper was unveiled at the 2012 New York Auto Show.

Preliminary specifications include the following:

 Tremec TR6060 six-speed manual transmission with final drive ratio of 3.55. 50 percent improvement in torsional stiffness over previous model.
 Electronic stability control, traction control, 4-channel anti-lock brake system (ABS), carbon fiber and aluminum skin with 0.364 drag coefficient (Cd), Pirelli P Zero Z-rated tires, 4-piston Brembo brakes with fixed-aluminum calipers with vented 355x32mm diameter rotors.
 20 mm lower seating position, 7-inch full-color customizable instrument cluster, Uconnect RA3 or RA4 Access in-vehicle connectivity system with optional SiriusXM Travel Link and a Harman Kardon audio system.
 Bi-xenon projector headlamps with white light-emitting diode (LED) daytime running lamps and LED turn signals, LED taillamps with integrating stop-and-turn illumination and snakeskin texture lens.
 A maximum speed of 332 km/h (206 mph) and a 0–100 km/h (0-60 mph) acceleration time of 3.50 seconds.

The only notable change for the 2014 model year was the addition of a third traction control mode for improved performance during rain.

Sales of the Viper for 2013 and 2014 were poor. In October 2013, production was reduced by 1/3 due to low sales and growing inventory. In April 2014, production ceased for over two months due to slow sales. Dodge addressed the issue by reducing the price of unsold 2014 models by US$15,000 and announced the 2015 models would carry the new, lower price tag.

There was also an improved highway fuel economy of 20mpg.

In October 2015, Fiat Chrysler group announced that the Viper would end production in 2017. Initially, Fiat Chrysler cited poor sales as a reason for discontinuing the Viper; however, other sources have stated the car was discontinued because the Viper was unable to comply with FMVSS 226 safety regulation, which requires side-curtain air bags. In July 2017, Fiat Chrysler announced they would be permanently closing the Conner Assembly Plant on August 31, 2017.

Viper Production 
Viper Production Details

European market 
The SR l and SR II Viper were exported to Europe and sold as a Chrysler.

The ZB I Viper was sold in Europe during 2005–2006. It was the first model to be sold as a Dodge, as part of Chrysler's new sales strategy for the European market. In the United Kingdom it is referred to as a Viper, but was sold as the Dodge SRT-10, as the Viper name is a registered trademark in the UK.

Special variants

Road packages

Viper ACR 
SR II:

The American Club Racing (ACR) variant was first introduced as a package on the 1999 Viper GTS (Phase SR II).

The ACR used the same K&N air filter and smooth tubes from the GT2 for the power gains along with the BBS rims. A new 5-point harness with the ACR logo was installed for both the driver and passenger. For the 1999 model year, Koni adjustable shocks were installed and changed to Dynamics later in the 2000 model year. Lastly, the spring rates were increased. The ACR was available in solid color or with stripes with the color choices changing yearly along with ACR badging. The ACR came standard with air conditioning and radio deleted, but could be added back in as a $10,000 option.

ZB II: 

The ACR made a come back to the Viper line-up after the 2008 model year. Its upgrades were more drastic than the original, including street-legal racing tires (Michelin Pilot Sport Cups which Michelin describes as "Ultra-High Performance Sport tires"), two-piece brake rotors, adjustable suspension, and significant aerodynamic enhancements that included a front splitter, canards and a carbon fiber adjustable rear wing. The ACR is street-legal, and is similar to the MOPAR Viper that Dodge displayed at various auto shows. The interior was upgraded only by the addition of a beacon-tripped lap timer (Hardcore Edition Only).

The Viper ACR was built alongside the standard SRT-10 at the Conner Avenue plant in Detroit. The aerodynamic components were produced by Plasan Carbon Composites and assembled to the vehicle by Prefix Corporation located in Rochester Hills, Michigan.

On September 14, 2011, on the Nürburgring, a 2010 Dodge Viper SRT10 ACR completed the sixth fastest production, street-legal car lap ever recorded with a 7:12.13 elapsed time. Chrysler's press release claimed a new production car lap record, although three faster laps had been recorded more than two years earlier, albeit by very specialized low production vehicles.

VX I:

At SEMA 2014, Dodge presented a Viper ACR concept car based on the new VX I platform. After many rumors and speculations, the car was eventually introduced in 2015 for the 2016 model year. The base price of the 2016 ACR was US$121,395 in the United States and CA$159,995 in Canada.

The brakes were from Brembo, with discs and calipers built specifically for the car. The discs were now carbon ceramic, a first for the Viper series. The braking system contains  discs with 6-piston calipers up front, and  discs with 4-piston calipers down the rear. The tires were from Kumho, using a set of tires called the Kumho Ecsta V720 ACR, a variant of the V720 specifically built for the ACR. The front tires are P295/25R19Z, slightly smaller than the regular Viper, and P355/30R19Z at the rear. Suspension system is manufactured by Bilstein, which has 10 settings for rebound and compression tuning for the dampers.

The options for the car are very diverse, like all of the other Viper trims. One example is the ACR Extreme Aero Package, which was the same package used to help the car break a total of 14 track lap records. The package included the addition of a removable extended front splitter extension, a new adjustable dual-element rear wing, four dive planes, six removable diffuser strakes, removable brake ducts, and removable hood louvers, and if removed, will reveal a hood gap. With this package, the top speed was reduced at  instead of  because of the massive downforce produced by the car. At top speed, the car produces  of downforce, the most of any production car.

In October 2015, the ACR set a 7:01.67 lap time at the Nürburgring Nordschleife with the Extreme Aero Package, which was run by SRT, and lapped by their test driver Dominik Farnbacher. Unfortunately, the lap was unofficial according to SRT.

A crowdfund attempt started by volunteer Russ Oasis in 2017 on the GoFundMe funding platform began collecting funds to reclaim the lap record on the Nürburgring. Crowdfunding ended up being as high as $198,000. He eventually found himself supported by 377 people, and sponsorship and assistance from Kumho Tire (tire supplier), Prefix Performance (formally known as Arrow Performance) (logistics and parts supplier), ViperExchange (car loaners), and Fox Pro Films (lap filming). SRT test driver, racing driver, and former Nürburgring record holder Dominik Farnbacher returned to the track to help the group retake the record. Racing drivers Luca Stolz, Mario Farnbacher, and Lance David Arnold came in as well. Their target was the second position car in street legal vehicles, the Lamborghini Huracán Performante, which set a 6:52.01 lap record. The group went through three attempts, with the lap times of 7:03.45 (set by Dominik Farnbacher), 7:03.23 (set by Mario Farnbacher), and 7:01.30 (set by Lance David Arnold), respectively. Their three-day trip to Nürburg, Germany ended with a crashed Viper ACR.

Despite the failure of surpassing the Huracán Performante, the team was still able to make the Viper ACR the fastest American, rear-wheel driven (with no additional assistance), and manual transmission equipped car to go around the track. Their lap time also brought the car to fifth position for street legal vehicles.

Viper GTC (Phase VX I only) 
The GTC model was introduced in 2015, and was only featured in the VX I phase Vipers.

The 2015–2017 Dodge Viper GTC had a customization program that offered 8,000 colors and 24,000 hand-painted stripes, 10 wheel choices, 16 interior trims, 6 aero options, and an undisclosed amount of standalone options to choose from. There are a total of 25 million possible build combinations.

Ordering a GTC enrolled a customer in a unique VIP program called Viper Concierge, which according to Dodge, "offers an exclusive point of contact throughout the custom Viper build process." The Concierge process started with the ordering stage, which included Dodge sending customers a paint chip confirming the owner's choice. Shortly thereafter, Dodge sent buyers a 1:18-scale "speed-form" replica in their chosen custom colors, to confirm or deny the build. Once the buyer's color and option selection is locked-in, that car becomes a one-of-one Viper for that year – no other buyer would be permitted to build a Viper to the same specifications.

Viper TA (phase VX I only) 

The Time Attack (TA) model was introduced in 2013 and was only featured in the VX I phase Vipers.

The TA model had two variants, 1.0 and 2.0, each variant different from the other. The number of 2015–2017 TA package 1.0 and 2.0 cars produced is unknown but the numbers are relatively low. To add to the confusion, the full TA 1.0 or 2.0 package could be added to the GTC one of one configuration. Also, besides the original run of 2014 TA 1.0 with the production number being stated as xx/33 (or xx/93 for the orange TA 1.0). The TAs built from 2015 to 2017 were numbered in sequence. For example, #11 was built in 2015 and #22 in 2016.

The 1.0 was sold by SRT and was made as a small enhancement for the Viper GTS.

The car now had the addition of the Advanced Aerodynamic Package (two-piece front corner splitters and a rear decklid spoiler made from carbon fiber), lightweight Sidewinder II wheels finished in matte-black, Pirelli P Zero Corsa tires, two-mode (Street and Race) Bilstein DampTronic suspension adapted from the GTS, but with firmer levels of damping and a smaller spread between modes, shock dampers, increased spring rates and thicker anti-roll bars, carbon fiber underhood X-brace (instead of the aluminium brace in all other models), carbon fiber rear tail light applique from the Exterior Carbon Fiber Accent Package, two-piece Brembo brake rotors with wider brake annulus, black-anodized Brembo brake calipers painted with the Viper logo in TA Orange, TA logos behind both front wheels and a Stryker decal instead of the standard badge on the hood (TA Orange on the Venom Black cars, black on the TA Orange and Venom White cars), black interior with TA Orange accent stitching on the ballistic cloth seats, instrument panel & cowl, center stack, console, hand brake, shifter boot, and door panels. The aerodynamic package adds 200 pounds (90.72 kg) of downforce at 100 mph (160.93 km/h). The car's mileage is 12 mpg in city, and 19 mpg on the highway.

On March 18, 2013 Motor Trend tested the SRT Viper TA in Mazda Raceway Laguna Seca, setting the production car lap record in 1:33.62, besting the previous lap time holder Chevrolet Corvette ZR1's 1:33.70.

Even with the release of the TA 2.0, the 1.0 was still available as a package.

The TA edition returned for the 2015 model year called the TA 2.0 (but the TA 1.0 was still available up to and including the last model year, 2017). This model was sold by Dodge.

The 2.0 part of the moniker refers to the updated aero package, which incorporates a bigger rear wing, new front dive planes, and a new carbon-fiber front splitter. The package improves downforce to 400 pounds at 150 mph versus the 2014 Viper TA's 278 pounds at 150 mph. The internal parts have also been improved, with a much better suspension setup, new two-piece Brembo rotors, and improved shocks, dampers, springs, and stabilizer bars. The car also has an improved X-brace.

The car's power output also stays the same like the 1.0. However, the data is based on the Dodge version of the Viper, not the SRT version. Unlike the 1.0, the car is able to keep the  top speed. The car's mileage is improved in the 2.0 version, with 13 mpg in city, and 20 mpg on the highway.

GT2 Champion Edition 

In 1998, the GT2 Champion Edition was introduced. With the FIA GT2 Team and Driver series wins in October 1997, Team Viper set forth with the development of a unique Viper model called the GT2 Champion Edition to commemorate the race wins (contrary to popular belief, the GT2 Champion Edition was not built to meet any homologation effort, as the race car came first). Only 100 were made.

The team started working on the concept in November 1997 with design concept approved in January 1998, prototype parts in February 1998, pricing approval of $85,200 in April 1998, and production from June 16 to July 7, 1998. The vehicles were the first to be built in VIN (Vehicle Identification Number) sequential order with the first having 001 as its last three on the VIN and the last being 100.

The GT2's exterior is best known for its white with blue stripes paint, large rear wing, front dive planes and splitter, side sills, American flag, BBS rims, and GTS-R badging, which caused many to refer to the vehicle as the GTS-R. However, the GTS-R was the race version of the Viper and not street legal. The GT2 also features an Oreca 5-point racing harness, and the center dash plaque with the vehicle's unique production number.

Racing editions

Viper ACR-X 
To commemorate the end of the Phase ZB II Viper and mend the gap from the car's production end until the release of the new car, Dodge offered an improved version of the ACR specifically designed to run in the Dodge Viper Cup Series. It is a purpose-built race car, and is not street-legal. According to Dodge, the car beat the regular record-holding ACR around Mazda Raceway Laguna Seca by about three seconds (1:33.9 to 1:31). Price increased by US$12,000, to $110,000. Production was planned for the spring of 2010. In February 2012, the Viper ACR-X posted a lap time of 7:03.058 around the Nürburgring, which was more than 9 seconds faster than the regular Viper ACR upon which it is based.

Viper-based vehicles

Alfa Romeo Zagato TZ3 Stradale 

The Alfa Romeo Zagato TZ3 Stradale is the road version of the TZ3 manufactured by Alfa Romeo and designed by Zagato.

The TZ3 Stradale is the fourth model in Zagato's TZ line and serves as Zagato's tribute to the 100th anniversary of Alfa Romeo. The car itself is based on the Viper ACR-X but with a new carbon fiber body. As planned, only 9 vehicles were built. Not only is the chassis and powertrain from the ZB II Viper, but the interior remains mostly the same as well.

Bristol Fighter 

The Bristol Fighter is an English sports car by Bristol Cars, and is the first sports car made in 40 years after the company was revived.

The power is delivered to the rear wheels through a 6-speed manual transmission, which is also Viper-derived.

Only 13 cars were ever produced from its 2004–2011 production run.

Devon GTX 

The Devon GTX is an American sports car manufactured Devon Motorworks, which was intended to enter production but was denied by Chrysler since it didn't reach the construction goal of US$10 million, which meant the car remained a concept.

The GTX is based almost entirely on the Viper, albeit with a few changes. The exhaust system has been changed into Devon's own stainless steel variant, along with a revised intake system, a new one-piece carbon fiber superstructure, carbon fiber body panels, new cast-aluminum unequal-length front and rear suspension wishbones, new coil-over shocks, and StopTech race-inspired aftermarket brakes. The GTX was also intended to produce  at 6,100 rpm from the Viper-derived 8.4-liter V10 engine.

Prefix Viper Medusa Roadster 
The Prefix Viper Medusa Roadster is a convertible conversion package available for the VX I generation Viper.

Prefix unveiled the Viper Medusa Roadster at a private event at their Prefix Coatings facility in Auburn Hills, Michigan on July 19, 2014. Created under their latest division named Prefix Performance, the Medusa is a conversion of the VX I Viper that was never offered as a roadster. The initial run was limited to 10 custom numbered vehicles at a price of $35,000 on top of the price of the vehicle.

VLF Force 1 V10 

The VLF Force 1 is a premium sports car manufactured by VLF Automotive, a company formed by Bob Lutz and Gilbert Villareal, who were later joined by Henrik Fisker as lead designer.

The Force 1 is heavily based on the Dodge Viper, using its chassis and engine, and also has a similar design language. The car's Viper-derived V10 engine generates .

Concept vehicles

Viper GTS-R Concept 
 
Ten years after the first Viper Concept was revealed, the 2000 GTS-R concept was shown. Osamu Shikado was responsible for the vehicle's exterior which is 3 inches lower and 2 inches wider than the production Viper at the time. Shikado used race-inspired lines with an aggressive stance. Most of these design cues were adapted to the 2003 ZB I generation Viper along with the interior. These included a higher belt line, a side gill, 'bump-up' rear fender shape, and a more defined side crease. Viewed from above, the front-to-rear stripe now is tapered.

Unlike most concepts, the 2000 Viper Concept was made as a complete car. It features a complete functional interior with air conditioning, adjustable pedals, and a premium sound system. The body is a single moulded carbon-fiber shell, with some subtle changes compared with the then outgoing model. An inch and a half has been taken out between the sill and the roof, which together with a chassis sitting two inches lower, gives the car a lower profile. Three inches have been added to the wheelbase and two inches to the track. The doors have also been lengthened, which combined with the longer wheelbase makes entry and exit from the car easier. Brakes are 14-inch ventilated discs with four-piston calipers. The front has the 19-inch wheels with P285/30 ZR Goodyear tires up and 20-inch rear wheels with P335/30 ZR tires.

Mopar Concept Coupé 

The concept appeared to have been a sneak peek at the then upcoming ZB II Viper ACR. Performance parts from this car are sold by Mopar.

SRT-10 Carbon 
For the 2003 SEMA show, Chrysler displayed a highly tuned Viper SRT-10 in coupé body style. The vehicle's name comes from the carbon fiber used to reduce the weight by 150 lbs bringing the total to 3,200 lbs. Along with the carbon fiber hardtop, a front splitter and rear wing were added; however those parts were not nearly as significant as those on the later SRT-10 ACR, and no downforce/drag information was provided to show that they were even functional. The car was only a concept.

This car was used as a test mule for the development for the Generation V SRT Viper. The car is no longer a show car, and most of its specialty parts were taken off during development for the new Generation V SRT Viper.

Firepower 

The Chrysler Firepower was a grand touring concept based on the Viper chassis that would have been equipped with the Hemi V8 engine coupled with an automatic transmission. Price would have been slightly lower than other models.

Copperhead 

The Dodge Copperhead was a concept car based on the Viper platform that was intended as a cheaper, more agile car. It was powered by Chrysler's 2.7 L LH V6 engine instead of the Viper's V10, which produced . It never reached production. Dodge produced a limited-production Copperhead Edition Dodge Viper, with copper-colored paint similar to the concept car and other changes.

SEMA Concept 

The SEMA concept car is a version of the 2013 SRT Viper coupe demonstrating Mopar products for SRT Viper. Changes include yellow body colour, carbon fiber parts at underhood, exposed carbon fiber performance cross X-Brace trimmed in a satin finish, a decal-cut Viper "Stryker" logo in the center of X-Brace, engine cover in carbon fiber and aluminum with the SRT logo, prototype aluminum oil filler cap with the SRT logo, a carbon fiber aero package, Mopar coil springs, full black interior with yellow accents, Sabelt hard-shell seats with a six-point safety harness, seat edging in black Katzkin leather with yellow accents in the perforations, Mopar billet aluminum shift knob, billet aluminum HVAC bezels and controls, carbon fiber bulkhead satchel with a universal integrated quick-release camera mount, polished chrome door-sill guards with the Viper logo, race-inspired sand-blasted aluminum Mopar bright pedal kit with the Viper logo etched in the pedals, footrest pedal with "Stryker" logo, optional "Track Pack" wheels finished in hyperblack, a front tow hook and an LED fog lamp kit.

The vehicle was unveiled in the 2012 SEMA show.

The Mopar performance parts found in the SEMA concept car were sold as 2013 SRT Viper components.

Media

Viper television series (1994–1998) 

Chrysler launched a TV series called Viper in 1994 to serve as a promotional tool for the Viper. The show ran until 1998 with 1 NBC season and 3 syndicated follow-up seasons. Viper is a TV series about a special task force set up by the federal government to fight crime in the fictional city of Metro City, California that is perpetually under siege from one crime wave after another. The weapon used by this task force is a grey assault vehicle known as The Defender that masquerades as a Dodge Viper RT/10 roadster (and later, the Viper GTS coupe). The series takes place in "the near future". The primary brand of vehicles driven in the show were Chrysler or subsidiary companies. The series ran on NBC for one season in 1994 before being revived two years later for three more seasons of first-run syndication. Reruns of the series have appeared on Sci-Fi Channel and USA Network.

The Viper Defender "star car" was designed by Chrysler Corporation engineers unlike most Hollywood Film/TV cars that are usually customized by film picture designers. The car was built on a heavily modified RT/10 Chassis and is a completely functional prototype. Only 14 Defenders were made. The exterior design of the car was produced by Chrysler stylist Steve Ferrerio.

The Defender is a fictional assault vehicle that is said to be a highly sophisticated vehicle (contrary to the normal Viper's spartan nature) that can, at the flick of a switch, transform from a red RT/10 (later a blue GTS) into a grey/silver weaponized armored coupe.

Viper-themed video games 

The Dodge Viper (SRII) is featured exclusively in the 3D game Viper Racing, produced in 1998 by Monster Games Incorporated (MGI) and Sierra On Line. In 1998, Sega Pinball released, Viper Night Drivin.

Motorsport

Phase SR II 

In 1996, a race car based on the Viper was built, and was called the Chrysler Viper GTS-R (in American races, was named the Dodge Viper GTS-R). The construction was done by Chrysler and by the teams Reynard Motorsport and Oreca. The numbers the car used were vast, with numbers like #91, #51, #2, #92, and #52.

The car was unveiled in 1996 at the IMSA GT Championship, with the team Canaska Southwind, which competed in the GTS-1 class, the highest for GTS classes. Its first race was at the 24 Hours of Daytona and managed to finish at the 29th position, but fortunately the team would improve greatly, finishing 12th position in the 12 Hours of Sebring. The car wasn't able to reach much further however, which meant the team had to switch to GTS-2. Oreca had planned for racing in the 24 Hours of Le Mans with their own GTS-R.

Both teams appeared at the Le Mans each with two entries.  Three of those four cars managed to finish with Canaska Southwind earning the best result in tenth place.  The two teams returned to their respective series afterwards. Oreca finished the year with three races in the BPR Global GT Series getting an eighth place at Brands Hatch, ninth at Spa, and sixth at Nogaro. Canaska Southwind concluded the season by finishing second in class at Mosport and sixth overall.

For the later years 1999 and 2000, the efforts made by Oreca had expanded, racing in both the ALMS and FIA GT Championship respectively, earning them nine wins, and one by the racing team Paul Belmondo. Another team named Chamberlain had improved to finish second overall in the FIA GT. Back at ALMS, Oreca had taken the title, with six wins. Later at Le Mans, Oreca would go on to win their second consecutive win, with the top six positions in every class being taken by various GTS-Rs. The GTS-R had made its first appearance in the FFSA GT Championship, and saw the first overall win for Zakspeed in the 24 Hours of Nürburgring. Oreca left the FIA GT in 1999 to focus on ALMS, leaving the privateers to race there, and got 11 races out of it for Oreca. They did lose to the then-new Corvette factory racing team, but still won the championship. Back at the FIA GT, the Viper racing teams won four races, but were outrun by the Lister Storm racing teams, with them winning five races for them. This let them settle for second and third. In the FFSA, the three teams DDO, ART, and MMI teams would win a total of eight victories.

The Oreca racing team had left competition to focus on Le Mans Prototype racing for 2001. The rest of the teams left at later years, and the Viper GTS-R began fading by 2004, then left completely by 2010.

In 2006, a modified Dodge Viper GTS-ACR driven by Greg Crick under the team Crickcars.com entered the Australian GT Championship and won it, with 713 points in total.

Phase ZB I 

A new race car called the Viper Competition Coupe took the GTS-R's place for the second phase. The Competition Coupe had a carbon fiber composite body on a tubular steel frame with no interior trim and an FIA-legal roll cage. The exterior design of the Competition Coupe was based on the Viper GTS-R concept from 2000. Modifications to the mechanicals of the Viper included a 27-gallon fuel cell, differential cooler, ducted brakes, improved driver and engine cooling, trap door oil pan, low-inertia flywheel, an improved double-wishbone suspension system, new spherical bearing control arm attachments, two-way adjustable coil over dampers, and a driver-adjustable blade-type rear anti-roll bar. The anti-lock braking system added a distribution control system. The initial price of the car is around $100,000.

The Viper Competition Coupe was initially built for use in the Viper Challenge Championship one-make series starting in 2003. The Competition Coupe was later adapted for use in the Group GT3 instituted by the FIA, allowing its use in a variety of series in Europe and North America. French racing team Oreca made further modifications to the car, to allow it to race in Group GT2. Privateer teams used these cars to compete for certain series, with Racing Box in Europe for the International GT Open and Woodhouse Racing and Primetime Race Group in the United States carrying out independent programs in the American Le Mans Series.

Phase VX I

SRT Viper GTS-R 

The GTS-R returned in competition, but this time as an LM GTE class race car and instead, was constructed and designed by SRT Motorsports and Riley Technologies. It includes Michelin GT tires. The car retained the number #91 but had a new number for it called #93.

The vehicle was unveiled at the 2012 New York Auto Show, and it made its racing debut at the 2012 Mid-Ohio Sports Car Challenge where two GTS-Rs, driven by Kuno Wittmer and Dominik Farnbacher with car #91, and Marc Goossens and Tommy Kendall with car #93, finished 10th and 12th in the GT class, which was 23rd and 25th overall.

The racing team entering 2012 ALMS included Dominik Farnbacher, Marc Goossens, Ryan Hunter-Reay, Tommy Kendall, Jonathan Bomarito, and Kuno Wittmer.

The two GTS-Rs of SRT Motorsports finished 3rd in the GT class championship. The car made its debut at the Le Mans 24 Hours in 2013, where it finished eighth in class and 24th overall. Balance-of-performance regulations encouraged the car to run an unusually low rev limit of 4,700 rpm at Le Mans, taking advantage of the large V10 engine's low-end torque.

In 2014, with the ALMS folding and merging with the Rolex Sports Car Series, SRT soon entered the TUDOR United SportsCar Championship GTLM class. In the opening round, the 2014 24 Hours of Daytona, SRT took 3rd and 6th in class (12th and 27th overall, completing 675 and 653 laps respectively). Both cars were repainted at Watkins Glen in the red and white livery used in the late 1990s to early 2000s. The No. 93 Viper won class at Indianapolis Motor Speedway Brickyard Grand Prix in July 2014, after both cars took podium positions in the previous races at The Glen and Mosport.

In March 2014, Chrysler announced that it was withdrawing the Vipers from the 2014 24 Hours of Le Mans. The Vipers ended the season at Petit Le Mans with a team championship and driver's championship by Kuno Wittmer. Following the end of the 2014 season, Chrysler discontinued the factory program by SRT Motorsports.

SRT Viper GT3-R 

The Viper GT3-R was made available for race teams in the later half of 2013 at an estimated cost of $459,000. The car shares many technologies with the GTE race car but it is built to Group GT3 regulations.

The GT3 car was jointly developed by SRT Motorsports and Riley Technologies and the car features the same 8.4 L engine from the road car and is capable of producing  unrestricted. However actual output will be near to  due to balance of performance employed in GT3 championships. The car weighs in at 1,295 kg (2855 lbs) which is inside the 1,300 kg limit for GT3 cars.

The first win for the GT3-R spec Viper came on July 13, 2014 in the Tudor United SportsCar Championship at Mosport followed by a win in the Pirelli World Challenge at the Streets of Toronto in the second race on July 20, 2014. Dutch Supercar Challenge squad Team RaceArt won the 2014 and 2015 Super GT class championship in a Viper GT3-R.

Official lap records 
Since the debut of the ACR series, the ACR has been setting records all around the world, with most of them in the US. 28 of the 29 lap records have each been set by the ACR, with the last one made by the TA 1.0.

Phase SR II lap times 
The first Viper ACR (Phase SR II) had only set just one lap record, in Willow Springs. This particular lap time was taken in 2008, in which it didn't make the fastest overall lap.

Phase ZB II lap times 
The Viper SRT-10 ACR originally set 13 lap records back in its day. These laps were set by Gary Thomason and SRT drivers Dominik Farnbacher and Chris Winkler.

Phase VX I lap times 
The Viper ACR (Phase VX I) originally held 14 lap records. The Nürburgring Nordschleife lap was specific to records for American-made, manual transmission, and rear-wheel drive cars. The lap times were set by racing drivers Randy Pobst, Tommy Kendall, Lance David Arnold, and SRT vehicle dynamics and development engineer Chris Winkler.

Notes

References

Bibliography

External links 

 

Viper
Viper
1990s cars
2000s cars
2010s cars
Sports cars
Cars introduced in 1992